Danuše Nerudová, née Peslarová (born 4 January 1979) is a Czech economist and university professor. She was formerly the chair of the Commission for Fair Pensions and rector of Mendel University in Brno, both from 2018 to 2022. She was a candidate in the 2023 Czech presidential election, finished in third place in the first round vote.

Biography
Danuše Nerudová was born in Brno in 1979. She lives with her family in Kuřim. She received her primary and secondary education at elementary and kindergarten in Brno's Svornosti Square and at Gymnázium třída Kapitána Jaroše. She studied economic policy and administration at the Faculty of Operational Economics at Mendel University, completing her master's degree in 2002 and doctoral degree in 2005.

From September 2007, she was the head of the Institute of Accounting and Taxation at Mendel University's Faculty of Business and Economics. She was also vice-dean of the faculty from 2009 to 2014, and was also briefly vice-rector of the university (2014–2015), the youngest holder of both of these positions in the university's history. Her research focuses on tax policy and the harmonization of taxes within the European Union, as well as economic inequality between men and women, and the long-term sustainable financing of pension systems.

In 2017, she became a professor in the field of economics at the Prague University of Economics and Business. On 1 February 2018, she was appointed by President Miloš Zeman as the 39th Rector of Mendel University, until 31 January 2022.

2023 Czech presidential election

On 31 May 2022, Nerudová announced her intention to run for President of the Czech Republic in the 2023 election. She was one of three candidates supported by the Spolu political alliance. She finished third of eight candidates in the first round on 14 January 2023, with 13.93% of the vote, and subsequently endorsed Petr Pavel for the second round.

Personal life
She has been married since 2002 to lawyer Robert Neruda, with whom she has two sons Philip and Daniel.

References

1979 births
Living people
People from Brno
Candidates in the 2023 Czech presidential election
Civic Democratic Party (Czech Republic) presidential candidates
KDU-ČSL presidential candidates
TOP 09 presidential candidates
Mendel University Brno alumni
Czech educators
Women economists
Academic staff of Mendel University Brno
Female candidates for President of the Czech Republic